Jaylon Brown (born September 11, 1994) is an American professional basketball player for Pınar Karşıyaka of the Basketbol Süper Ligi (BSL). He played college basketball at Evansville (2013–2017). As a senior, he led the Missouri Valley Conference in scoring with 20.9 points per game and was named to the MVC All-Tournament Team.

Professional career
After graduating from Evansville in 2017, on 5 August 2017, Brown signed with Karpoš Sokoli.
On October 12, 2017, he made his debut for Sokoli against MZT Skopje scoring 15 points in an 83–85 away win in Jane Sandanski Arena.

On July 25, 2018, Brown signed with RETAbet Bilbao Basket of the LEB Oro. He averaged 12.1 points and 2.3 assists per game during the 2019–20 season. On June 15, 2020, Brown re-signed with the team.

On July 21, 2021, Brown signed with Hamburg Towers of the German Basketball Bundesliga. Hamburg Towers also plays in the EuroCup.

On June 28, 2022, Brown signed with Pınar Karşıyaka of the Turkish Basketbol Süper Ligi.

References

External links
 Evansville Purple Aces bio
 RealGM Profile
 CBSSports Profile
 Sports-reference Profile

1994 births
Living people
American expatriate basketball people in Finland
American expatriate basketball people in North Macedonia
American expatriate basketball people in Spain
American men's basketball players
Basketball players from Indiana
Bilbao Basket players
Evansville Purple Aces men's basketball players
Hamburg Towers players
Karşıyaka basketball players
Liga ACB players
People from Fishers, Indiana
Point guards